NAFW is an acronym for:

 National Assembly for Wales
 Naval Air Facility Washington, U.S. Navy base located within Andrews Air Force Base